Sultan Mahmut Fountain is a historical public fountain in İstanbul, Turkey.

It was commissioned by Ottoman sultan Mahmut II (reigned 1808–1839) in 1814. Its ornamental slab as well as the inscription is made of marble. The inscription includes a tughra of the sultan. The inscription was written by Yesarizade Mustafa Izzet Efendi.

Presently, the fountain is out of use.

References

Buildings and structures completed in 1814
Ottoman architecture in Istanbul
Fountains in Istanbul
Sarıyer
19th-century architecture in Turkey